Nærøysundet is a strait in the municipalities of Nærøysund in Trøndelag county, Norway. The village of Rørvik, is located along the Nærøysundet, on the northwestern side. The  strait is crossed by the Nærøysund Bridge which connects the mainland and the island of Inner-Vikna. The shipping lane along the Norwegian coast passes through the strait, and the ship traffic is guided by the Nærøysund Lighthouse.

References

Landforms of Trøndelag
Straits of Norway
Nærøysund